Hexa(methoxymethyl)melamine (HMMM) is a hemiaminal ether commonly used as a crosslinking agent in the production of coatings and tires. It is produced via the reaction of melamine with formaldehyde and excess methanol, with the later also acting as a solvent for the reaction. It can be considered as a monomeric intermediate in the formation of melamine resin.

Hexamethoxymethylmelamine is used along with resorcinol in the production of vehicle tires, where it improves adhesion between the rubber and the steel reinforcing cords. As it has some water solubility it slowly leaches out of the rubber; particularly from the particles formed as the tires wear-down through use. Road runoff then introduces it into urban waters, where it has become a contaminant of emerging concern.

See also
 Rubber pollution

References

Triazines